Farma 11 - East vs West is the 11th season of the Slovak version of The Farm reality television show based on the Swedish television series of the same name. The show was filmed from August 2019 and premiered on September 2, 2019 on Markíza.

Format
Sixteen contestants are chosen from the outside world. This year twist is East Slovakia vs West Slovakia. In each team there are eight contestant. Followed first few weeks another four contestant joined cast. After 6th week, contestants are merged into one group. In first six weeks each group nominated one person who will compete in Farmer of the Week challenge. Since week 7, the Farmer is chosen by the contestant evicted in the previous week.

Nomination process
The Farmer of the Week nominates two people, one from each group as the Butlers. The others must decide which Butler is the first to go to the Battle. That person then chooses the second person for the Battle and also the type of battle. The Battle winner must win three duels. The Battle loser is evicted from the game.

Ages stated are at time of contest.

Nominations

The game

References

External links
http://farma.markiza.sk
Farma Markíza 

The Farm (franchise)
2019 Slovak television seasons